Amed Davy Sylla (born 4 October 1982) is a footballer who has played for FC Nordjylland, ÍF Fuglafjørður, B36 Tórshavn, Birkirkara, FC Amager, Hvidovre IF, Istres, Alfortville and Cesson Sévigné. A forward, Sylla holds French, Ivorian and Russian citizenship.

References

External links

1982 births
Living people
Footballers from Lille
French footballers
French expatriate footballers
Expatriate men's footballers in Denmark
Expatriate footballers in the Faroe Islands
Expatriate footballers in Malta
Ligue 2 players
FC Istres players
Association football forwards
French expatriate sportspeople in Denmark
French expatriate sportspeople in Malta
French sportspeople of Ivorian descent